Nimit is a sangkat of Poipet Municipality in Banteay Meanchey Province in north-western Cambodia. Before the establishment of Poipet Municipality, it was a khum of Ou Chrov District.

Villages
Nimit contains 15 villages.

 Nimit I
 Nimit II
 Nimit III
 Nimit IV
 Ou Chrov
 Dong Aranh
 Soriya
 Nimit Thmei
 Thma Sen
 Anlong Svay
 Kon Damrei
 Kap Thom
 Raksmei Samaki
 Raksmei Serey Pheap
 Sok San

References

Communes of Banteay Meanchey province